Fazalpur railway station is a railway station on Moradabad–Ambala line under the Moradabad railway division of Northern Railway zone. This is situated at Humayun Puriddu in Bijnor district of the Indian state of Uttar Pradesh.

References

Railway stations in Bijnor district
Moradabad railway division